State Road 2 (SR 2) in the U.S. State of Indiana is an east–west route running from the Illinois border at Illinois Route 17 east to the outskirts of South Bend, Indiana, at the U.S. Route 20/U.S. Route 31 freeway, also known as the St. Joseph Valley Parkway.

Route description

Illinois to Valparaiso 

SR 2 begins at the Illinois–Indiana State Line where Illinois Route 17 ends. It then heads east toward Lowell; beyond Lowell there is a short concurrency with State Road 55 (SR 55), followed by an interchange with Interstate 65 (I-65) at exit number 240. After SR 2 leaves US 231 it heads north-northeast toward Valparaiso.

Valparaiso to LaPorte 

SR 2 enters Valpariso from the southwest and joins U.S. Route 30 (US 30).  At the State Road 49 (SR 49) exit, SR 2 joins SR 49 north.  Soon after SR 2 leaves SR 49 and heads northeast toward LaPorte.  Passing through Westville, there is a short concurrency with U.S. Route 421 (US 421).

LaPorte to South Bend 

SR 2 enters LaPorte from the west along with State Road 39 (SR 39).  In downtown LaPorte SR 2 has an intersection with U.S. Route 35 (US 35); here, SR 39 is concurrent with US 35.  From this point, SR 2 is a four-lane divided highway.  SR 2 heads northeast from LaPorte to Rolling Prairie where it meets US 20.  Here, US 20 and SR 2 switch alignments at a roundabout interchange; US 20 follows the north and west legs of the interchange, while SR 2 follows the south and east legs.  On the west side of South Bend, SR 2 ends at an interchange with US 20 and U.S. Route 31 (US 31).

History 
SR 2 has been largely replaced by the Indiana Toll Road (Interstate 80/Interstate 90) and by US 20. SR 2 appears to be part of an old alignment from Kankakee, Illinois, to South Bend and runs more diagonally than other east–west state highways in Indiana.

In Valparaiso, SR 2 has been rerouted around the downtown and central business districts of the city. Instead of traveling through the city along Washington Street, SR 2 shares portions of the routes of US 30 and the Valparaiso Bypass (SR 49).

Several times in its history, SR 2 has run along the path of the Lincoln Highway.

Old Indiana State Route 2 

Until the completion of the St. Joseph Valley Parkway around the South Bend – Elkhart area, SR 2 continued to downtown South Bend, mostly along Western Avenue (which remains, but no longer has state highway markers). SR 2 originally followed the Lincoln Highway to Fort Wayne before U.S. Route 33 (US 33) supplanted it east of downtown South Bend. Part of SR 2's former routing is now State Road 933 (SR 933).

Major intersections

References 

Northwest Indiana
002
Indiana State Road 002
Transportation in South Bend, Indiana
U.S. Route 33
Transportation in Lake County, Indiana
Transportation in LaPorte County, Indiana
Transportation in Porter County, Indiana
Transportation in St. Joseph County, Indiana
1926 establishments in Indiana